Hilarographa vinsonella is a species of moth of the family Tortricidae. It is found on Réunion in the Indian Ocean.

References

Moths described in 2013
Hilarographini